Lee Nguyen (born October 7, 1986) is an American professional soccer player who plays as a midfielder for Ho Chi Minh City FC.

Nguyen's 15 year playing career spanned the Netherlands, Denmark, Vietnam, and the United States, where he appeared in over 250 league matches in Major League Soccer. After winning two Eredivisie titles and a Johan Cruijff Shield with PSV Eindhoven, Nguyen spent two seasons in Vietnam, before moving to Major League soccer, where he led the New England Revolution to the 2014 MLS Cup final and won the 2019 Supporter's Shield title with LAFC. Nguyen returned to Vietnam to sign for Ho Chi Minh City in 2021.

Youth and college
Nguyen graduated from Plano East Senior High School in his native Texas and was named National Gatorade Boys Soccer High School Player of the Year in 2005. He played one season for Indiana University in 2005, producing five goals and 12 assists in 22 games and was selected as 2005 National Freshman of the Year by Soccer America and Soccer Times. Nguyen was also a first team All-Big Ten selection and Big Ten Freshman of the Year.

Club career

PSV Eindhoven
Nguyen began his professional career by signing a three-and-half-year deal with Dutch Eredivisie team PSV Eindhoven in February 2006, but after making just two appearances with the club's senior team, he moved on to get more first-team time somewhere else.

Randers FC
On January 31, 2008, Nguyen signed with the Danish Superliga club Randers FC until the summer of 2009. He made 23 appearances with the club in parts of two seasons.

Hoàng Anh Gia Lai
With Nguyen still hoping to remain in Europe but ready for a change of scenery, V.League 1 club Hoàng Anh Gia Lai, based in the centrally located city of Pleiku, gave his Vietnamese father a contract offer in January 2009 to pass along to his son. The offer was much more lucrative than what he could have hoped for anywhere else, but by accepting it he took himself completely off the United States Men's National Team radar at the age of 23 after just three appearances.

Nguyen became the Vietnamese league's first American player when he signed with Hoàng Anh Gia Lai on January 17, 2009. He scored 13 goals and 16 assists in 24 appearances in all competitions for the club in 2009. Through club partnership connections, Nguyen spent the middle of 2009 training with English club Arsenal in the hopes of earning another contract in Europe.

Becamex Binh Duong
In January 2010, Nguyen signed with another V.League 1 club, Becamex Binh Duong F.C. in Thủ Dầu Một. Injuries limited his impact as he scored just one goal in five appearances for the club in one and a half years. His desire to play for the U.S. was rekindled, however, by the August 2011 hiring of head coach Jurgen Klinsmann, whose style Nguyen hoped would better fit his midfield skills. Despite a large new contract offer in Vietnam, he decided to return to the U.S.

New England Revolution
Nguyen signed a multi-year deal with Major League Soccer on December 7, 2011 and was originally allocated to the Vancouver Whitecaps FC in a weighted lottery.  He made three preseason appearances with Vancouver before being waived on March 1, 2012. On March 2, 2012, he was selected by the New England Revolution with the second overall pick in the MLS Waiver Draft.

Nguyen made 30 regular-season appearances for the Revolution in 2012, including 27 starts. He finished second on the team with five goals and was voted the Midnight Riders Man of Year by the fans. His second career MLS goal—and second goal of the game against Vancouver on May 12—was one of four finalists for the MLS Goal of the Year Award.

In 2013, Nguyen appeared in 33 league matches, scoring four goals and recording seven assists.

In 2014, Nguyen led the Revolution with 18 goals and 5 assists, which is the most ever by a midfielder in an MLS season, and was again voted the Midnight Riders Man of the Year.  For his contributions to the team—including 9 game-winning goals in the regular season—Nguyen was named as a finalist for the 2014 version of the Major League Soccer MVP Award along with Seattle Sounders FC forward Obafemi Martins and Los Angeles Galaxy forward Robbie Keane. Nguyen's goal against the Houston Dynamo also made it to the final round of voting for the 2014 version of the MLS Goal of the Year Award.

Nguyen led the team in assists and finished second in scoring during the 2015 season.

During the 2016 season, Nguyen became the Revolution's team captain. He led the team in assists, with 10, and finished 3rd in goals scored, with 6.

In August 2017, The Revolution reportedly rejected a $1 million bid for Nguyen from Israeli Premier League side Maccabi Haifa. He would finish the 2017 season first in assists, and second in goals scored, with 15 and 11 respectively.

Citing frustration over his contract (he was at the time the seventh-highest paid player on the team, making $500,000, despite ranking fifth in the league in over-all goals over the previous four seasons), Nguyen reportedly demanded a trade at the end of the 2017 season on three separate occasions. The dispute would ultimately lead to his sitting-out the team's pre-season training camp.

Los Angeles FC
On May 1, 2018, New England traded Nguyen to Los Angeles FC in exchange for $350,000 in General Allocation Money and $350,000 in Targeted Allocation Money. On July 26, 2018, Nguyen scored on a free kick leading Los Angeles FC to a 2–0 lead over LA Galaxy. The match ultimately ended 2-2 after a second-half comeback by their crosstown rival.

Inter Miami CF
On November 19, 2019, Nguyen was selected by MLS expansion side Inter Miami CF in the 2019 MLS Expansion Draft.

Return to New England Revolution
Nguyen was traded back to the Revolution on September 8, 2020 for a fourth-round selection in the 2021 MLS SuperDraft and up to $50,000 in General Allocation Money.

Nguyen made 12 appearances for the Revolution in 2020, starting 8 matches and scoring one goal, an 80th minute penalty against NYCFC on October 11.

Ho Chi Minh City FC

On December 25, 2020, Ho Chi Minh City announced the signing of Nguyen.

On August, 8, 2021, Nguyen left Ho Chi Minh City FC to return back in Texas as the V-League 2021 season ended early due to the Covid-19 Pandemic in Vietnam.

Return to soccer and 2nd stint at Ho Chi Minh City
After retiring from playing and becoming the assistant coach of the Washington Spirit in early 2022, on August 6, 2022, Nguyen came out of retirement and return to play for Ho Chi Minh City.

International
After playing for several United States junior level squads, namely the Under-18s, Under-20s, and Under-23s, including being the only high school player named to the Under-20 roster for the 2005 FIFA World Youth Championship, Nguyen made his debut for the senior United States Men's National Team in a friendly against China on June 2, 2007. He made two other appearances with the team in 2007 as part of the Copa América roster.

On November 10, 2014, Jürgen Klinsmann called up Nguyen for the first time in seven years for friendlies against Colombia and the Republic of Ireland, and again on January 9, 2015, for the training camp ahead of the friendlies against Chile and Panama. Nguyen made his reappearance with the USMNT as a substitute in a friendly match against Costa Rica on October 13, 2015.

Coaching career
On February 4, 2022, Nguyen announced his retirement from professional soccer and re-signed with the Washington Spirit as an assistant coach.

Honors
PSV Eindhoven
Eredivisie: 2006–07, 2007–08
Johan Cruijff Shield: 2008

Los Angeles FC
Supporters' Shield: 2019

Individual
MLS Best XI: 2014
Gatorade High School Soccer Player of the Year: 2005

Career statistics

Club

International

Personal life 
Lee Nguyen's father, Pham Nguyen, fled to the United States a few years before the fall of Saigon, in 1973, and they were later resettled in Richardson, Texas, where Lee was born. His father was an avid soccer fan but he was forced to quit playing due to ongoing Vietnam War.

In 2012, Nguyen was named one of The Boston Globe's 25 Most Stylish Bostonians.

Nguyen holds dual citizenship of the United States and Vietnam.

References

External links 
 
 
 

1986 births
Living people
American sportspeople of Vietnamese descent
Sportspeople of Vietnamese descent
People from Richardson, Texas
Sportspeople from the Dallas–Fort Worth metroplex
Soccer players from Texas
American soccer players
Association football midfielders
Indiana Hoosiers men's soccer players
Ajax Orlando Prospects players
PSV Eindhoven players
Randers FC players
Hoang Anh Gia Lai FC players
Becamex Binh Duong FC players
New England Revolution players
Los Angeles FC players
Eredivisie players
Danish Superliga players
V.League 1 players
Major League Soccer players
United States men's youth international soccer players
United States men's under-20 international soccer players
United States men's under-23 international soccer players
United States men's international soccer players
2007 Copa América players
American expatriate soccer players
American expatriate sportspeople in Vietnam
American expatriate sportspeople in Denmark
American expatriate sportspeople in the Netherlands
Expatriate footballers in Vietnam
Expatriate men's footballers in Denmark
Expatriate footballers in the Netherlands
Inter Miami CF players
Washington Spirit non-playing staff